Michalis "Mika" Kakiouzis (alternate spellings: Michail, Michailis, Mihalis) (Greek: Μιχάλης Κακιούζης; born November 29, 1976) is a Greek former professional basketball player and coach. He is currently working as the head coach for Keravnos of the Cyprus Basketball Division A. During his playing career, at a height of 2.07 m (6 ft. 9  in.) tall, Kakiouzis was able to play at both the small forward and power forward positions.

Early years
Kakiouzis began playing basketball at the age of 8, with the youth team academies of Ionikos NF, in Greece.

Professional career
Kakiouzis made his debut with the Ionikos N.F. senior club in the 1992–93 season. He played three seasons in the Greek 2nd Division. At the age of 18, he became the 2nd scorer and rebounder of the Greek 2nd Division.

He was in the squad that brought Greece the gold medal at the 1995 FIBA Under-19 World Cup for junior men. This was a stepping stone for his journey toward AEK Athens, as his performance at the 1995 Junior World Cup with Greece got him a contract with AEK, one of the powers of the top Greek League.

Kakiouzis had a fruitful stay at AEK Athens. While with the club, he won a Greek League championship in the 2001–02 season, and he also won two Greek Cups, in the years 2000 and 2001. He also won the Saporta Cup with AEK, in the year 2000.

After leaving AEK Athens in the year 2002, Kakiouzis went on to play for Montepaschi Siena in Italy. With Siena, he won both the Italian League championship and the Italian Supercup in the 2003–04 season. He was also named to the All-Italian League Team for the season by the Eurobasket.com website.

In 2005, Kakiouzis left Siena and joined Barcelona Basquet of the Spanish League. He stayed with Barcelona until his contract expired in 2007. He then joined the Spanish League club Sevilla.

Kakiouzis signed with the Turkish League club Efes in 2008. On August 27, 2009, he returned to the Greek League and signed with Aris Thessaloniki. In 2011, he signed with Vanoli Basket to help the team to avoid relegation.

In January 2012, he signed with the Italian League club Virtus Roma. In October 2012, he signed with SAV Vacallo Basket of the Swiss League. In 2013, he played for the Cypriot League club AEK Larnaca. In the summer of 2013, he participated in the training camp of Olympiacos. He then joined the Greek club AENK in 2013. On 19 January 2015, after averaging 9 points and 6 rebounds, he left AENK.

On 23 January 2015, Kakiouzis moved to Cyprus and signed a contract with APOEL. He joined the Greek 2nd Division club, Faros Keratsiniou, for the 2015–16 season.

On 4 January 2016, he announced that his retirement as a player would come at the end of the 2015–16 season.

National team career

Greek junior national team
At the age of 15, Kakiouzis became a player of the national junior teams of Greece. With the Greek junior national team, he won the gold medal at the 1993 FIBA Europe Under-16 Championship. He was also on the Greek national junior squad that brought Greece the gold medal at the 1995 FIBA Under-19 World Cup for junior men. He would later go on to be a key member on Greece's senior national team as well.

Greek senior national team
Kakiouzis was the captain of the senior men's Greek national basketball team. He was a member of the Greek team that won the gold medal at the 2005 EuroBasket, and was also a member of Greece's silver medal winning team at the 2006 FIBA World Championship. Kakiouzis was on Greece's team that competed at the 2004 Summer Olympic Games, which was held in Athens. He also competed with Greece's senior team at the 1999 EuroBasket, 2001 EuroBasket, 2003 EuroBasket, and the 2007 EuroBasket.

Coaching career
After he retired from playing professional club basketball, Kakiouzis became the lead scout of the Greek club AEK Athens. In 2018, he began a career working as a basketball coach. On April 7, 2022, Kakiouzis signed with Keravnos of the Cypriot Division A, to be the club's head coach.

Awards and achievements

Greek junior national team
1993 FIBA Europe Under-16 Championship: 
1995 FIBA Under-19 World Cup:

Greek senior national team
3× Acropolis Tournament Champion: (2005, 2006, 2007)
2005 EuroBasket: 
2006 FIBA Stanković World Cup: 
2006 FIBA World Championship:

References

External links
Euroleague.net Profile
FIBA Profile
Eurobasket.com Profile
Greek Basket League Profile 
Hellenic Basketball Federation Profile 
Italian League Profile 
Spanish League Profile 
AEK Profile

1976 births
Living people
2006 FIBA World Championship players
AEK B.C. players
AEK Larnaca B.C. players
Anadolu Efes S.K. players
APOEL B.C. players
Aris B.C. players
ASVEL Basket players
Basketball players at the 2004 Summer Olympics
Basketball players from Athens
Real Betis Baloncesto players
Faros Keratsiniou B.C. players
FC Barcelona Bàsquet players
FIBA EuroBasket-winning players
Greek basketball coaches
Greek Basket League players
Greek expatriate basketball people in Spain
Greek men's basketball players
Ionikos N.F. B.C. players
Keravnos B.C. coaches
Liga ACB players
Mens Sana Basket players
Nea Kifissia B.C. players
Olympic basketball players of Greece
Pallacanestro Virtus Roma players
Power forwards (basketball)
SAV Vacallo Basket players
Small forwards
Vanoli Cremona players